Martesia striata is a species of bivalve belonging to the family Pholadidae.

The species has almost cosmopolitan distribution.

References

Pholadidae